"I Know Where I'm Going" is a traditional Scottish (some sources say Irish) ballad about a wealthy love-struck young woman pining for her "bonnie" lover Johnny who some say has a bad reputation. It has been noted since the early nineteenth century. It is Roud number 5701.

In some versions the lover is said to be 'black'. This may refer to him being an outlaw or of bad reputation.

Chorus 
The song contains the refrainI know where I'm going
I know who's going with me

I know who I love
The devil/dear knows who I'll marry The term in the fourth line is sometimes pronounced “deil,” an old Scottish version of “devil” as in Robert Burns's “The  Deil’s awa' wi' the Exciseman.”

Notable recordings 
It was recorded by Burl Ives on 31 March 1941 for his debut album Okeh Presents the Wayfaring Stranger.

It has also been recorded by Kathleen Ferrier,  Odetta, The Weavers, The Fureys, The Clancy Brothers, Judy Collins, Barbara Dane, The Highwaymen, The Tarriers, The New Christy Minstrels, Harry Belafonte, Carolyn Hester, Richard Thompson and English singer Laura Wright.

Pete Seeger sang the song to open Episode 16 of his Rainbow Quest television program, originally broadcast on 26 February 1966.

The tune has also been used for a hymn or spiritual song, "I Know Why There's Music in the Quiet Summer Morning."

Film 
The  Michael Powell and Emeric Pressburger film I Know Where I'm Going! (1945) got its title from this song at the suggestion of Powell's wife Frankie Reidy, and the song was orchestrated and used in the film.
The tune is also used throughout the Nicholas Ray film noir They Live by Night (1948).

References 

 

Burl Ives songs
Year of song unknown
Songwriter unknown
The Highwaymen (folk band) songs